The 2020 Ukrainian miner protests were spontaneous and sporadic nationwide rallies and general strikes organised between summer-autumn 2020 led by miners underground, protesting deteriorating conditions and demanding pension preferences due to the conditions, better working conditions and wage increase in Ukraine. The miner strikes would be the biggest in Ukraine since 1996, when a massive strike movement hit the nation. Coal miners, steel workers protested for 11 days in July 2020 in western and eastern Ukraine, demanding the cease of coal imports to Russia and better wage increase. After 11 days of peaceful marches, miners won the protests and coal operations restarted, as if one of their main demands. A spontaneous protest movement took place in the fall of 2020, when miners/protesters waved the Ukrainian flag and demonstrated difficult working conditions and demanded improvement of conditions and wage increase affairs. After 43 days of protests, the miners suspended their strikes and paused their demands.

See also
 No to capitulation!
 1996 Ukrainian miner protests

References

Protests in Ukraine
2020 protests
Miners' labor disputes
2020 labor disputes and strikes